Yozgatspor was a Turkish sports club based in Yozgat, Turkey. The football club played in the TFF Third League. They played in the Süper Lig between 2000–2002 and relegated to the Third League in the 2008–09 season. They finally relegated to the Turkish Regional Amateur League and lost professional status. Between 1997 and 2008, the club was named as Yimpaş Yozgatspor.

League participation
 Turkish Super League: 2000–02
 TFF First League: 1992–94, 1995-00, 2002–06
 TFF Second League: 1984–92, 1994–95, 2006–09
 TFF Third League: 2009–2014
 Turkish Regional Amateur League: 2014–2015
 Amateur Leagues: 1959-1984

Honours
TFF First League 
 Winners (1): 1999–2000
TFF Second League
 Winners (2): 1991–92, 1994–95

External links
 Yozgatspor Official Website 
 Yozgatspor profile on TFF

Sport in Yozgat
Football clubs in Turkey
Association football clubs established in 1959
1959 establishments in Turkey
Süper Lig clubs